Colleen Kay Sostorics (born December 17, 1979 in Kennedy, Saskatchewan) is a Canadian retired women's ice hockey defenseman.  She has played extensively for Canada at the international level, including three Olympic gold medals (2002 in Turin, 2006 in Salt Lake City, and 2010 in Vancouver).  At the Women's World Championships, Sostorics has helped Canada to three gold and three silver medals, and at the 4 Nations Cup, she has captured five gold medals and one silver medal.  When not playing with Canada, she competes at the club level for the Calgary Oval X-Treme who now play in the Western Women's Hockey League (WWHL).

Playing career

Minor hockey
Colleen Sostorics began playing hockey in her hometown of Kennedy, Saskatchewan, on the local boys' teams until the age of 17.  In 1996, she captained her boys' hockey team at the bantam level.  She played for Team Saskatchewan at the 1995 Canada Winter Games and the 1997 National Under-18 Championship.

University
After completing her minor hockey career in Saskatchewan, she accepted an offer to move to attend the University of Calgary, where she played for the women's hockey team.  After the 1997–98 season, Sostorics was named to the All-Star Team after the Canada West Championship Tournament.  Calgary captured the bronze medal at this tournament.  She earned this honour again after the 1998–99 Canada West Championship Tournament.  Calgary captured the silver medal at the Canada West Tournament in 1998–99.  In addition to the Canada West honours, Sostorics was named a Canadian Interuniversity Athletics Union (CIAU) All-Canadian after both the 1997–98 and 1998–99 seasons.  After the 1999–00 Canada West season, Sostorics was named a Canada West Second Team All-Star.

Club team
She played for Alberta in the Esso National Women's Championship and won the Abby Hoffman Cup in 2001, 2003 and 2007.

International
In 1999, Sostorics made her Team Canada debut with the Under-22 National Team at the 1999 Christmas Cup, winning a gold medal.  In 2000 and 2001, she continued to play with the Under-22 team, capturing gold medals at the Nations Cup tournament both years.  She served as team captain during the 2000–01 season.  Her performance at the Under-22 level earned her a spot on the Senior Women's National team for the 2001 World Women's Hockey Championship.  At this tournament, she contributed two goals and an assist as Canada won the gold medal.

In 2002, Sostorics was named to Canada's team for the 2002 Winter Olympics, held in Salt Lake City, Utah. During the tournament, she contributed two assists as Canada took the gold medal.  In 2004 and 2005, she also played at the World Championships, winning gold and silver medals respectively.

On September 14, 2010, Hockey Canada announced that Sostorics, along with three other players retired from international hockey.

Personal
Her parents' names are Lanny and Jean.  She has one brother, Mark.  After winning a gold medal at the 2002 Winter Olympics, her hometown of Kennedy named a street after her.  She convocated with a bachelor's degree in economics from the University of Calgary in 2004.

During her youth, Sostorics competed in soccer and fastball in addition to playing hockey.  In 1997, she won provincial championships in all three sports.  She was named Most Valuable Player at provincial fastball tournaments in 1994 and 1995.  Now, she plays rugby in addition to hockey.  She won a national rugby championship with Team Alberta in 2003.

Statistics

International

Club team

Statistics Source

Awards and honours
 Top Defender, 2003 Esso Women's Nationals

References

External links
 
 
 
 
 

1979 births
Calgary Dinos ice hockey players
Calgary Oval X-Treme players
Canadian women's ice hockey defencemen
Ice hockey people from Saskatchewan
Ice hockey players at the 2002 Winter Olympics
Ice hockey players at the 2006 Winter Olympics
Ice hockey players at the 2010 Winter Olympics
Living people
Medalists at the 2002 Winter Olympics
Medalists at the 2006 Winter Olympics
Medalists at the 2010 Winter Olympics
Olympic gold medalists for Canada
Olympic ice hockey players of Canada
Olympic medalists in ice hockey